Mircea Anastasescu (18 March 1931 – 1987) was a Romanian sprint canoer who competed from the early 1950s to the early 1960s. He won two medals at the ICF Canoe Sprint World Championships with a silver (K-2 500 m: 1963) and a bronze (K-1 500 m: 1954).

Anastasescu also competed in three Summer Olympics, earning his best finish of fourth in the K-2 1000 m event at Melbourne in 1956.

References

Sports-reference.com profile

External links
 

1931 births
1987 deaths
Canoeists at the 1952 Summer Olympics
Canoeists at the 1956 Summer Olympics
Canoeists at the 1960 Summer Olympics
Olympic canoeists of Romania
Romanian male canoeists
ICF Canoe Sprint World Championships medalists in kayak